Karateh-ye Vasaj is a village in Khezel-e Sharqi Rural District, Khezel District, Nahavand County, Hamadan Province, Iran. At the 2006 census, its population was 159, in 33 families.

References 

Populated places in Nahavand County